Mohammad Hosseini (born 1961) is an Iranian politician and who is currently serving as the vice president for parliamentary affairs in the cabinet of Ebrahim Raisi.
 
He served as minister of culture in the second cabinet of Mahmoud Ahmadinejad. He is also a military figure and the veteran of the Iran–Iraq War. He is part of the Mahmoud Ahmedinejad's close circle.

Early life and education
Hosseini was born in Rafsanjan in the Kerman province in 1961. He holds a PhD in Islamic jurisprudence and the fundamentals of Islamic law from Tehran University in 1994.

Career
Hosseini joined the Islamic Revolutionary Guard Corps (IRGC) following the 1979 revolution and served during the Iran–Iraq War. After the war, he served in different posts, including the head of the Sorush Publications, deputy director of the Islamic Republic of Iran Broadcasting, and advisor of the Islamic Culture and Relations Organization. He also served as Iran's cultural consular in Kenya. In addition, he taught fiqh and Islamic law at Tehran University. He was also a member of the fifth Majlis, representing his hometown, Rafsanjan, in the 1990s. During his tenure at the Majlis he also worked as the vice minister of science.

Hosseini was appointed minister of culture on 3 September 2009, replacing Hossein Saffar Harandi in the post. Hosseini won 194 votes in favor and 61 votes against at the Majlis. In the cabinet of Mahmoud Ahmedinejad, Hosseini was one of the ministers who had experience in the IRGC.

Hosseini's term ended on 15 August 2013 and he was replaced by Ali Jannati in the post.

Sanctions
The European Union sanctioned Hosseini in October 2011 due to his alleged repressive approach against journalists in Iran. It was also argued by AFP that he had been reinforcing media censorship and the arrest of journalists in Iran.

References

External links

1961 births
Faculty of Theology and Islamic Studies of the University of Tehran alumni
Government ministers of Iran
Islamic Revolutionary Guard Corps personnel of the Iran–Iraq War
Living people
Members of the 5th Islamic Consultative Assembly
People from Rafsanjan
Academic staff of Payame Noor University
Popular Front of Islamic Revolution Forces politicians
University of Tehran alumni
Academic staff of the University of Tehran
YEKTA Front politicians